Michigan Islands Wilderness Area, a relatively small wilderness area of 12.5 acres (0.05 km2.), consists of Pismire Island, Scarecrow Island, and Shoe Island within the Michigan Islands National Wildlife Refuge.  These three islands, which constitute part of the group of islands that make up the larger refuge, were elevated to the rank of a United States wilderness area in 1970.  All three islands are noted for their infrequent human visitation and their roles as breeding grounds for freshwater wading birds, such as the great blue heron.

The three islands that make up this Wilderness Area are widely separated from each other.  Scarecrow Island is in Lake Huron, and Pismire Island and Shoe Island are in Lake Michigan.

Lake Huron
Scarecrow Island is located in Thunder Bay, a U.S. National Marine Sanctuary in northwestern Lake Huron.  The island is situated approximately 2 miles (3 km) off shore of Michigan's Negwegon State Park south of Alpena in Sanborn Township, Alpena County.

Lake Michigan
Pismire Island and Shoe Island are located in the Beaver Island archipelago in far northern Lake Michigan.  Pismire Island is located approximately 3.5 miles (5.5 km) northeast of St. James, a harbor on the northern end of Beaver Island, while the secluded Shoe Island is located approximately 14 miles (22.5 km) west of Waugoshance Point.

References

Protected areas of Alpena County, Michigan
Protected areas of Charlevoix County, Michigan
IUCN Category Ib
Wilderness areas of Michigan